Antonio Dell'Oglio (born 19 June 1963) is an Italian former professional footballer who played as a midfielder.

References

1963 births
Living people
Italian footballers
Association football midfielders
Serie A players
Serie B players
F.C. Pavia players
Ascoli Calcio 1898 F.C. players
ACF Fiorentina players
A.C. Monza players
S.S. Juve Stabia players
S.S. Turris Calcio players
Taranto F.C. 1927 players
A.S.D. Martina Calcio 1947 players
A.S. Melfi players